Arthur Alfred Kenneth Lawrence (born 3 November 1930) is a former English cricketer.  Lawrence was a right-handed batsman who bowled leg break.  He was born at Marlborough, Wiltshire.

Lawrence made his first-class debut for Sussex against Oxford University in 1954, with him playing a second match that season against Leicestershire in the County Championship.  He next appeared for Sussex in 1954, making 26 further first-class appearances between 1954 and 1956, with his final first-class appearance coming against Northamptonshire in the 1956 County Championship.  In total, Lawrence made 28 first-class appearances for Sussex, scoring 632 runs at an average of 17.08, with a high score of 63 not out.  This score was one of three fifties he made and came against Oxford University in 1955, in a match in which he also recorded another half century score of 62.  He took a single wicket during his first-class career.

References

External links
Arthur Lawrence at ESPNcricinfo
Arthur Lawrence at CricketArchive

1930 births
Living people
People from Marlborough, Wiltshire
English cricketers
Sussex cricketers